The educational system of Myanmar (also known as Burma) is operated by the government Ministry of Education. Universities and professional institutes from upper Burma and lower Burma are run by two separate entities, the Departments of Higher Education (Lower Burma and Upper Burma), whose office headquarters are in Yangon and Mandalay respectively. The education system is based on the United Kingdom's system, due to nearly a century of British and Christian presences in Burma.
"The first Government high school was founded by the British colonial administration in 1874. Two years later, this Government High School was upgraded and became University College, Rangoon."
Nearly all schools are government-operated, but recently, there has been an increase in privately funded schools (which specialise in English). In Myanmar, schooling is compulsory until the end of elementary school, probably about 9 years old.  However the international standard for schooling is 15 to 16 years old.

The literacy rate of Myanmar, according to the 2014 Myanmar Census stands at 89.5% (males: 92.6%, females: 86.9%). The annual budget allocated to education by the government is low; only about 1.2% is spent per year on education. English is taught as a second language from kindergarten.

Most of the early mission schools are since 1860 (such as La Salle schools) in Myanmar were nationalised on 1 April 1965 after the order restoration of general Ne Win.

The Human Rights Measurement Initiative (HRMI) finds that Myanmar is fulfilling only 84.3% of what it should be fulfilling for the right to education based on the country's level of income. HRMI breaks down the right to education by looking at the rights to both primary education and secondary education. While taking into consideration Myanmar's income level, the nation is achieving 96.7% of what should be possible based on its resources (income) for primary education but only 71.9% for secondary education.

History
During British colonial rule, educational access for women improved tremendously. In the pre-colonial era, male education was emphasised in the traditional Buddhist monastic education system. The number of female students enrolled in school rose 61% (by 45,000 students) from 1911 to 1921, and another 82% (100,000 students) from 1921 to 1931 with expansion of the colonial and private education system, primarily in the form of all-girls schools. This was mirrored by an increase in female employment. From 1921 to 1931, there was a 33% increase in employment of women in public administration, law, medicine (96% increase), education (64% increase), and journalism sectors.

When Burma gained independence in 1948, the government sought to create a literate and educated population, and Burma was believed to be on its way to become the first Asian Tiger in the region. However, 1962 coup d'état isolated and impoverished Burma. All schools were nationalised and educational standards began to fall. Burmese replaced English as the medium of instruction at Burmese universities in 1965, with the passing of the New University Education Law a year earlier. This led to a rapid decline in English proficiency among the Burmese. English was reintroduced as a medium of instruction in 1982. In 1977, the 2 year regional college system was introduced by the Burmese government, as a way to disperse college students until they were about to graduate (the third and fourth years were spent at a traditional university), a system that was ended in 1981.

Due to the student protests of the 8888 Uprising, all universities were closed in Burma for 2 years. During the 1990s, the newly introduced structure perpetuated a weak education system as the government's response to the crises was to introduce one 6-month term for each academic year. The SPDC government arranged irregular commencement dates for universities and colleges, but, students were still participated in clashes with the government. Another series of student strikes in 1996 and 1998 resulted in a further 3 years of closure.

After the re-opening of universities and colleges in 1999, the government scattered universities in different regions. The relocation of certain universities were made under relative ministries. The new system reduced university degrees by one year, providing a bachelor's degree for just three-year course. However, improvements were rapidly made despite the early disturbances. In 2005, the Ministry of Foreign Affairs officially announced that Burmese education was reaching international standards and the government had fully accredited 156 universities and colleges in Myanmar.

Today, Myanmar lags far behind in terms of educational standards. Learn-by-rote education, poorly-trained teachers, bribery, as well as use of out-dated resources have been the trademarks of primary and secondary schools of Myanmar. Furthermore, students are obliged to follow onerous after-school tuition since learning at school is not considered enough. Students learn everything by heart, from answers of English grammar questions to essays. Sometimes all questions asked in tests are given in advance. Exceptionally, some standard 4, standard 8 and standard 10 test answers are unseen unless the test papers are stolen. Many universities have been built and scattered throughout cities to prevent students participation in potential unrest.

Besides these actions, students attending these universities are not allowed to speak freely, to write freely or to publish freely.

Uniform

School uniforms are mandatory throughout public schools in Burma, from kindergarten until the 10th standard. The current uniform rule, known as the "White and Green" by colours, was mandated on 14 February 1966. From kindergarten to the 4th standard, the compulsory uniform for boys is a white shirt and green pants, which can be short or long. Shoes or Burmese sandals may be worn. The uniform for girls is similar, consisting of a white blouse and a skirt or pants. From the 5th standard until matriculation, traditional Burmese attire is considered appropriate school uniform. The uniform for boys is a white shirt (with an English collar or a mandarin collar) and a green sarong called a pahso, along with Burmese sandals. For girls, a traditional Burmese blouse (either the yinzi, with a front opening, or the yin hpon, with a side opening) and a green sarong called a htamein are worn, along with Burmese sandals.

School teachers also have to wear the same traditional attire as the students.

Levels

Preschool and kindergarten
Preschools are opened for children over 2 years of age and they are in extensive care or public systems. Kindergarten starts from the age of 5 (not younger than 4 Years and 8 months at the time of school's commencement date). Primary, Lower Secondary and Upper Secondary Schools in Burma are under the Department of Basic Education. The official commencement date for those schools is 1 June.

Primary education
Primary education is officially compulsory. It lasts five years, and to continue onto secondary school, students must pass a comprehensive examination on basic subjects.

Secondary education
Secondary schools are usually combined, containing both middle and high schools. Secondary Middle schools offer classes from standard 5 to standard 8 whereas Secondary High school offers classes up to standard 10. Children of rich and well-known families are often given easier access to the more prestigious secondary schools. There is much corruption in educational equality. But in both primary and secondary schools, the system is almost "no-failure education system". Only at the end of the high schools or at the entrance of the college/university, the system is changed.

High schools students choose one of 2 tracks upon entering high school: science or arts. All high school students take Myanmar, English, and mathematics. However, Science-specialised students also take 3 additional subjects: chemistry, physics and biology as part of their coursework, while arts-specialised students take geography, history and economics. These routes also determine what matriculation subject exams they are administered and what tertiary schools they can apply to.

At the end of standard 10, students take the University Entrance Examination, commonly referred to as the matriculation exam in English, administered by the Board of Examinations annually in mid-March.  High marks in a subject garner a distinction known as gondu. Students who achieve distinctions in four or more subjects (or a combined total of approximately 480/600) are generally guaranteed placement in one of Myanmar's medical universities and senior engineering universities, the most selective of universities. Test score results are released at testing sites throughout the country in June. Since 2007, Mon State has had the highest matriculation pass rates in the country.

Students who attend international English-language schools or other private schools are typically not eligible to sit for the matriculation exam, nor are they allowed to enroll in Burmese universities. Instead, they typically study overseas, at destinations such as Singapore, Malaysia, Australia, United Kingdom and the United States. In 2010, 695 Burmese international students studied in the United States, particularly in private liberal arts colleges.

Myanmar secondary education has numerous problems. It completely emphasizes upon rote learning and memorization and regurgitation inhibiting students' creative thinking and critical thinking skills. Teachers themselves learn under the authoritative systems so they are usually resistive to current changes in teaching methods.

Tertiary education

See also

 Myanmar National Education Law 2014

References

External links
 
 Myanmar School Directory
 Ministry of Education (MOE)
 ASEAN University Network
 Burma's Rangoon University 1957, History lecture by Professor Kyaw Thet's YouTube video  Teaching media was English even for that History, arts subject.
 UNESCO Education in Burma. UNESCO. Retrieved 13 February 2006.